"Run 2" is a song by English rock band New Order. It was released by Factory Records on 28 August 1989 as the third and final single from their fifth studio album, Technique (1989). The album version was listed as simply "Run".

Overview
"Run 2" was remixed by Scott Litt from the version on Technique, hence the appendage of "2" to the title. The main difference is that the song has been made more radio-friendly by editing down most of the long instrumental run-out and appending it with a final repeat of the chorus. Litt's mix strips back much of the echo and layers of synthesizers, and in place centres the mix on Sumner's vocal and the bass guitar of Peter Hook. Despite the effort taken to produce a radio single, only 20,000 of the Factory 12" release were ever pressed. 500 7-inch records were also pressed, for promotional use. The single was only released in the UK.

John Denver's publishing company filed a lawsuit, alleging that the guitar break in "Run" too closely resembled Denver's "Leaving on a Jet Plane". The case was settled out of court. The song has since been credited to New Order and John Denver.

"Run 2" is backed with the B-side titled "MTO". This song recycles the line "You've got love technique" from the group's previous hit single "Fine Time" (this is the only lyric in the track). An extended mix of "Run 2" with additional beats by Afrika Islam and an alternate 'minus' mix of "MTO" by Mike "Hitman" Wilson appear as B-sides on the 12" version of the single.

Artwork
Peter Saville, the single's cover designer, claimed to have been inspired by the design of laundry powder packaging. The tiny print on the back of the sleeve says, "Cover by Peter Saville Associates after Bold."

Track listing

Chart positions

Video
The video was directed by the photographer / filmmaker Robert Frank and produced by Michael Shamberg. The band was filmed in Los Angeles, while the street scenes are in New York City featuring the British actor David Warrilow.

References

New Order (band) songs
1989 singles
Songs written by Bernard Sumner
Songs written by Peter Hook
Songs written by Stephen Morris (musician)
Songs written by Gillian Gilbert
Songs written by John Denver
Factory Records singles
1989 songs
UK Independent Singles Chart number-one singles